The third edition of the Copa América de Ciclismo was held on 5 January 2003 in São Paulo, Brazil.

Results

References 
 cyclingnews

Copa América de Ciclismo
Copa
Copa
January 2003 sports events in South America